Great Glen (or Glenn) is a village and civil parish in the Harborough District, in Leicestershire, 2 miles south of Oadby. The population of the civil parish at the 2011 census was 3,662. Leicester city centre is about seven miles north west. Its name comes from the original Iron Age settlers who used the Celtic word glennos meaning valley, and comes from the fact that Great Glen lies in part of the valley of the River Sence. The 'great' part is to distinguish the village from Glen Parva.

Features and amenities
In 1751 a turnpike bridge was built over the River Sence as a part of the stagecoach route from Leicester to London. The pubs The Pug & Greyhound (The Old Greyhound) and The Crown were originally coaching inns built soon after the new road opened. This road later became the A6 road, and a bypass around the village was opened in 2003. The Midland Main Line runs to the south of the A6, and formerly had a station to serve the village at the closest point.

Leicester Grammar School is constructed on the land of Mount Farm, Great Glen.

There are two other schools in the village, the C of E St Cuthbert's primary school, which feeds to the local state schools in the neighbouring village of Kibworth and the town of Market Harborough. The independent school, The Stoneygate School, also has its site at Great Glen. Its pupils won Best Junior Choir at BBC Songs of Praise 2005 School Choirs Contest

Only four of the village pubs remain open, to date:
 The Yews
 The Royal Oak
 Fox Pond
 The Pug & Greyhound (formerly The Greyhound).

The village park, The Recreation Ground on Bindleys Lane is the home of two of the village's sports clubs:
 Glen Villa FC
 Great Glen Cricket Club.

At the centre of the village on the Stretton Road/Oaks Road T-junction is Great Glen Methodist Church, a Grade II* listed building. Built in 1827 it houses many activities including Sunday morning and evening services, a Sparklers mums and toddlers group on Mondays, Fusion children's group on Sunday mornings and Confusion alternate Friday evenings for teenagers. View the church at Google Maps

The village is serviced by a Post Office and a Co-op store.

The K6 Red telephone box on the village green is a listed building.

Footballer Trevor Benjamin used to live here, and Engelbert Humperdinck has a home in the village.

Stretton Hall
Stretton Hall was built in the early 18th century, and though named after Stretton Magna it lies in Great Glen parish. It was built as the manor house of the lordship of Stretton, by, or for, the Hewett family: it was the English residence of Colonel William Hewett (1693–1766), friend of the famous Marquess of Granby, of the novelist Laurence Sterne, and of the eccentric John Hall-Stevenson and his "Club of Demoniacs". Hewett set acorns all over his estate to create a plantation of oaks, some of which were disposed to form a double colonnade like that in front of St Peter's in Rome. These obtained a gold medal from the Society of Arts.

Leicestershire and Rutland Joint Board for the Mentally Defective bought the hall in 1932 for conversion to a hospital. Under the NHS it was a residential hospital for learning disabled children and had 157 beds in 1979. The hospital closed in the 1990s and a housing development has been built on part of the site.

History
Great Glen was the central place of an early Anglo-Saxon multiple estate. The settlements that comprised this estate are: Great and Little Stretton, Wistow, Newton Harcourt, Fleckney and Kilby. These parishes comprise the minimal extent of the estate which broadly follow the River Sence, Glen itself possibly taking its name from an earlier British river-name Glen or from Glennos meaning valley. It is possible that the estate extended further west along the river to Glen Parva where it joins the River Soar. It has not been possible to establish this securely. Glen (as at glenne, not Great Glen) enters the record for the first time in AD 849, when Alhhun, bishop of Worcester tarried there with nine of his clerics to issue a charter granting lands in Worcestershire to King Beorhtwulf of Mercia.

The medieval manorial history of Glen is outlined by John Nichols in his History of Leicestershire. In the 16th century, Henry Grey, 1st Duke of Suffolk, father of Lady Jane Grey, became the lord of the manor. After his execution for treason, his lands were seized by the crown.

Following the Battle of Naseby in 1645, during the English Civil War, Great Glen played host to a band of Cromwellian soldiers who were pursuing some of the (defeated) Royalist Cavalry. They were later joined by the rest of the army who camped overnight before moving onto Leicester. Some of these soldiers made camp in the church where they caused much damage (such as breaking all the windows), of which some evidence can still be seen today. There are five road names in the village that mark these events: Cromwell Road, Naseby Way, Ruperts Way, Edgehill Close and Halford Close.

The old public house, The Fox and Goose, is still visible on Church Lane but has been converted to a private residence.

References

External links

 

Villages in Leicestershire
Civil parishes in Harborough District